The Concrete Confessional is the seventh studio album by American metalcore band Hatebreed. It was released on May 13, 2016, via Nuclear Blast and was produced by Chris "Zeuss" Harris.

Background 

On March 23, 2016, a trailer was uploaded to the Nuclear Blast YouTube channel, detailing Hatebreed's upcoming album by revealing its cover art, track listing and release date. The trailer features several snippets of three songs from the album, these being "A.D.", "Looking Down the Barrel of Today" and "The Apex Within". The trailer also includes details of the band's upcoming tours across Europe and North America, in support of the album. An official lyric video for the first single from the album, "A.D", was released on April 8, 2016.

Writing and recording 

According to an article published by Loudwire, the album "deals heavily with topics such as social injustice, police brutality, drug abuse and self-positivity through positive mental attitude."

On the lyrical themes surrounding the opening track "A.D.", lead vocalist Jamey Jasta stated that the song "was a way that I could voice my frustration about the loss of opportunities available to the average guy. With the government and big business drowning in corruption and greed, the average person is being squeezed, so achieving the American dream is becoming less and less real. We all need to pay closer attention to what our elected leaders are doing. Start locally, in your own community, make your representatives accountable."

Reception 

The Concrete Confessional received mostly positive reviews from critics. On Metacritic, the album holds a score of 72/100 based on four reviews, indicating "generally favorable reviews".

Track listing

Charts

References 

2016 albums
Hatebreed albums
Nuclear Blast albums
Albums produced by Chris "Zeuss" Harris